(You shall weep and wail), 103, is a cantata by Johann Sebastian Bach, a church cantata for the third Sunday after Easter, called Jubilate.

It is the first of nine cantatas on texts by Christiana Mariana von Ziegler, which Bach composed at the end of his second annual cycle of cantatas in Leipzig. Based on the Gospel reading from the Farewell Discourse, where Jesus, announcing that he will leave, says "your sorrow shall be turned into joy", Bach contrasts music of sorrow and joy, notably in the unusual first movement, where he inserts an almost operatic recitative of Jesus in the fugal choral setting. The architecture of the movement combines elements of the usual concerto form with the more text-related older form of a motet. Bach scores an unusual flauto piccolo (descant recorder in D) as an obbligato instrument in an aria contemplating the sorrow of missing Jesus, who is addressed as a doctor who shall heal the wounds of sins. Bach scores a trumpet in only one movement, an aria expressing the joy about the predicted return of Jesus. The cantata in six movements closes with a chorale, the ninth stanza of Paul Gerhardt's hymn "".

History and words 

Bach composed the cantata in Leipzig for the Third Sunday after Easter, called Jubilate. The prescribed readings for the Sunday were from the First Epistle of Peter, "Submit yourselves to every ordinance of man", and from the Gospel of John, Jesus announcing his second coming in the so-called Farewell Discourse, saying "your sorrow shall be turned into joy". For this occasion Bach had already composed in 1714 , which he used later as the basis for the movement  in his Mass in B minor.

In his second year in Leipzig, Bach composed chorale cantatas between the first Sunday after Trinity and Palm Sunday, but for Easter he returned to cantatas on more varied texts, possibly because he lost his librettist. Nine of his cantatas for consecutive occasions in the period between Easter and Pentecost are based on texts by Christiana Mariana von Ziegler, this one being the first of the series especially written for Bach. He had possibly commissioned them in 1724 for his first cantata cycle but not composed them at that time, because of his exceptional workload in creating the St John Passion.

The librettist begins with a quotation from the Gospel, verse 20, and concludes with the ninth stanza of Paul Gerhardt's hymn "" (1653). Her own poetry reflects, in a sequence of recitatives and arias, in two movements sadness at the loss of Jesus, and in two others joy at his predicted return. Bach edited her writing considerably, for example in movement 4, excising two lines of four and rephrasing the others.

Bach first performed the cantata on 22 April 1725 with the Thomanerchor. For later performances, he revised the instrumentation, replacing the flauto piccolo by a flauto traverso.

Scoring and structure 

The cantata in six movements is scored for three vocal soloists (alto, tenor and bass), a four-part choir, trumpet, flauto piccolo (descant recorder in D), two oboes d'amore, two violins, viola and continuo.

 Chorus and arioso (bass): 
 Recitative (tenor): 
 Aria (alto): 
 Recitative (alto): 
 Aria (tenor): 
 Chorale:

Music 
The cantata begins in B minor, illustrating sorrow, but in  movement 4 shifts to the relative major key of D major, illustrating the theme of consolation in Ziegler's text.

The opening chorus has an unusual structure, which includes an arioso passage for the bass voice. All instruments except the trumpet play a ritornello, after which a choral fugue pictures the weeping and wailing of the text in unrelated musical material, rich in chromaticism. In great contrast the following line, "" (But the world will rejoice), is conveyed by the chorus embedded in a repeat of the first part of the ritornello. The sequence is repeated on a larger scale: this time the fugue renders both lines of the text as a double fugue with the second theme taken from the ritornello, then the ritornello is repeated in its entirety. The bass as the vox Christi (voice of Christ) sings three times, with a sudden tempo change to adagio, "" (But you will be sad) as an accompagnato recitative. Musicologist Julian Mincham notes: "This recitative is a mere eight bars long but its context and piteousness give it enormous dramatic impact. Bach's lack of respect for the conservative Leipzig authorities' dislike of operatic styles in religious music was never more apparent!" Klaus Hofmann compares the recitative's "highly expressive melody and harmony" to Bach's Passions. Finally, the extended sequence of fugue and ritornello with chorus returns transposed, on the text "" (Yet your sorrow shall be changed into joy). According to Alfred Dürr, the architecture of the movement is a large scale experiment combining elements of the older style of a text-related motet with the form of a concerto of instrumental groups and voices, as typically used by Bach.

John Eliot Gardiner, who conducted the Bach Cantata Pilgrimage with the Monteverdi Choir in 2000, notes that Bach's "strategy is to superimpose these opposite moods, binding them in a mutually enlightening whole and emphasising that it is the same God who both dispenses and then ameliorates these conditions.

Movement 2 is a secco recitative for tenor, concluding in an arioso section with a "deeply moving" melisma on the word "" (sorrows). Movement 3, "" (Besides You is no doctor to be found) is an aria for alto with the obbligato flauto piccolo, which according to Mincham, employs a "figuration ever striving upwards, moderates the underlying sense of potential tragedy". The alto recitative "marks a change of scene", it begins in B minor, like the opening chorus, but modulates to D-major and ends with a wide-ranging coloratura marking the word "" (joy). Movement 5, "" (Recover now, O troubled feelings), picks up the joyful coloraturas, supported by the trumpet and fanfares in triads in the orchestra, Mincham notes that the trumpet "bursts upon us with an energy, acclamation and jubilation unheard, so far, in this work". The cantata is closed with a four-part setting of the chorale, sung to the melody of "" which Bach used frequently, including in his St Matthew Passion.

Recordings 
The entries of the following table are taken from the listing on the Bach Cantatas Website. For several recordings, the name of the bass soloist is not provided. Ensembles playing period instruments in historically informed performance are marked by green background.

References

Sources 
 
 Ihr werdet weinen und heulen BWV 103; BC A 69 / Sacred cantata (4th Sunday of Easter) Bach Digital
 Ihr werdet weinen und heulen, BWV 103 Downloadable score (pdf) with modern clefs by atticbooks, 2016
 BWV 103 Ihr werdet weinen und heulen: English translation, University of Vermont
 BWV 103 Ihr werdet weinen und heulen: text, scoring, University of Alberta

Church cantatas by Johann Sebastian Bach
1725 compositions